= Hymn of Veria (My Queen) =

Song
- Released: 2014
- Songwriter(s): Nektarios Mpirtos

The Hymn of Veria or Vasilissa mou (My Queen) is the anthem of the Greek football club Veria F.C., based in Veria. The lyrics were written in 2014 by the Greek songwriter Nektarios Mpirtos, who was also the composer. Charis Akritidis was the first to perform the anthem.

Historically, the first hymn of Olympiacos was composed in 1960 by Giorgos Kalogirou.

The new hymn of Veria is in use since 23 August 2015 and its style is pop/dance based. It was released on 23 August 2015 and its release also included three Veria-dedicated songs, Kamari tou Vorra (Panache of the North), Pame gia goal (Go for goal), Tou Megalexandrou paidi (Alexander's The Great child).
